Stratford Transit provides the local bus service in Stratford, a city in Southwestern Ontario, Canada. The system is owned and operated by the city as part of the Community Services Department.

Services
Seven bus routes operate on loops throughout the community on a 30-minute schedule that converge at Stratford City Hall. Service runs on Monday to Friday from 6:00 am to 9:30 pm and on Saturday from 6:00 am to 7:30 pm. There are also additional industrial and school services. There is reduced service operating on Sundays on an hourly schedule.

Regular routes

Paratransit
Parallel Transit is the name of the city service that provides door-to-door accessible transportation only for individuals who are disabled. Registration and pre-approval is needed and 48-hour advance booking is required.

Intercity service
Stratford has 2 public transportation routes outside of the city, operated by Via Rail Canada, and GO Transit in the directions of Toronto to the east and London to the west from Stratford, Ontario railway station.

See also

 Public transport in Canada

References

External links
Bus Pictures of Stratford, Ontario
Transit History of Stratford, Ontario

Transit agencies in Ontario
Transport in Stratford, Ontario